Marie Dentière (–1561) was a Walloon Protestant reformer and theologian, who moved to Geneva.  She played an active role in Genevan religion and politics, in the closure of Geneva's convents, and preaching with such reformers as John Calvin and William Farel.  In addition to her writings on the Reformation, Dentière's writings seem to be a defense and propagation of the female perspective in the rapidly changing world. Her second husband, Antoine Froment, was also active in the reformation.

Biography
Much of Marie Dentière's early life remains unknown. She was born in Tournai (in modern Belgium) into a relatively well-off family of the lesser nobility.  She entered the Augustinian nunnery of Saint-Nicolas-dés-Prés in Tournai at a young age in 1508, eventually becoming abbess in 1521.

Martin Luther's preaching against monasticism led her to flee to Strasbourg in 1524 to escape persecution — not only for abandoning her position as a nun, but for converting to the Reformation. Strasbourg was a popular refuge for Protestants at that time.

While in Strasbourg, in 1528, she married Simon Robert, a young priest. Soon they left for an area outside of Geneva to preach the Reformation, and had five children together. Robert died 5 years later in 1533, and the now widowed Dentière married Antoine Froment, who was at work in Geneva with Farel. Dentière's outspokenness strongly irritated Farel and Calvin, which in turn drove a rift between them and Froment.

Religious accomplishments
Dentière's work stresses the importance of the Reformation, but also the need for a larger role for women in religious practice. To Dentière, women and men were equally qualified and entitled to the interpretation of Scripture and practice of religion.  In Geneva in 1536, following the successful rebellion against the Duke of Savoy and the local prince-bishop, Dentière composed The War and Deliverance of the City of Geneva. The work was published anonymously, and called for Genevans to adopt the Reformation.

In 1539, Dentière wrote an open letter to Marguerite of Navarre, sister of King Francis I of France. The letter, called the Epistre tres utile, or "very useful letter", called for an expulsion of Catholic clergy from France, advocated a greater role for women in the church, and criticized the foolishness of the Protestant clergy who compelled Calvin and Farel to leave Geneva.  The letter was quickly suppressed due to its subversiveness.

However her encouragement of women's involvement in writing and theology angered Genevan authorities.  Upon publication, the Epistle was seized and most of the copies destroyed.  Only approximately 400 copies of the letter survived and entered circulation. Following the publication and subsequent suppression of Dentière's work, the Genevan council prevented the publication of any other woman author in the city for the rest of the 16th century.

Notes

References

Bibliography
 , pp. xxx + 110.
 Disse, Dorothy,  "Do we have two Gospels, One for Men and Another for Women?", Other Women's Voices, May 5, 2006, retrieved May 13, 2006.
 Graesslé, Rev. Dr. Isabelle, "Reformation Sunday: Ecclesiastes 9:14–18a; 1 Ephesians 2: 4–9; John 8:12–14b", Semper Reformanda, retrieved May 13, 2006.
 .

1490s births
1561 deaths
Theologians from the Republic of Geneva
Writers from the Republic of Geneva
15th-century women
16th-century Calvinist and Reformed theologians
16th-century writers
16th-century women writers
European feminists
Calvinist and Reformed theologians
Protestant Reformers
Christian feminist theologians
Women religious writers
Roman Catholic abbesses
Walloon emigrants
Walloon people
Christian abbesses by nationality